DOS 5 or DOS-5 may refer to:

 The Soviet space station Salyut 6
 DOS 5 (OS/2), one of the early project names for the then still unreleased IBM and Microsoft OS/2 1.0 between 1985 and 1987
 DR DOS 5.0
 MS-DOS 5.x, by Microsoft
 IBM PC DOS 5.x, by IBM

See also
 DOS (disambiguation)
 DOS 4 (disambiguation)
 DOS 6 (disambiguation)
 DOS/V